Pacific Pines State Park is a  Washington state park on the Long Beach Peninsula, just north of Ocean Park. From the main parking area, there is a narrow, sandy footpath that leads through a grove of Pacific Ponderosa pine trees to the beach. The park offers picnicking, beachcombing, fishing, clamming, and crabbing.

References

External links

Pacific Pines State Park Washington State Parks and Recreation Commission 
Pacific Pines State Park Map Washington State Parks and Recreation Commission

Parks in Pacific County, Washington
State parks of Washington (state)